The Association of Asia Pacific Airlines (AAPA), formerly Orient Airlines Association, Inc., is a trade association of major scheduled international airlines based in the Asia-Pacific region. Established in 1966 with headquarters in Makati, Philippines, the association has moved to its present headquarters in Kuala Lumpur, Malaysia. The primary purpose of the AAPA is to serve as a common forum for the articulation of members’ views on matters and issues of common interest, to foster close cooperation, and to bring about an atmosphere conducive to the stimulation of the travel and tourism industry.

Mr Andrew Herdman held the position of Director General of the Association of Asia Pacific Airlines (AAPA) since November 2004 until February 2020, after which Mr Subhas Menon joined AAPA as Director General in March 2020. Mr Martin Eran-Tasker joined the AAPA as Technical Director in 2004 until July 2020, while Ms Beatrice Lim joined the AAPA as Commercial Director in July 2005.

Members
The Association currently has fourteen member airlines from the Asia-Pacific region:

 Air Astana
 Air India (SA)
 All Nippon Airways (SA)
 Bangkok Airways
 Cathay Pacific Airways (OW)
 China Airlines (ST)
 EVA Airways (SA)
 Garuda Indonesia (ST)
 Japan Airlines (OW)
 Malaysia Airlines (OW)

 Philippine Airlines
 Royal Brunei Airlines
 Singapore Airlines (SA)
 Thai Airways International (SA)

They collectively carry 285 million passengers and 10 million tonnes of cargo, representing approximately one-fifth of global air passenger traffic and one-third of global air cargo traffic respectively.'''

Departments, Committees and Working Groups

Technical Affairs Department

 Technical Committee
 Flight Operations and Safety Working Group
 Engineering & Maintenance Working Group
 Materials Management Working Group
 Security Committee
 Cargo Security Working Group
 Environment Working Group

References

External links
Association of Asia Pacific Airlines official website

 
Organizations established in 1966
Airline trade associations